John Herrick (born 26 July 1946) is an Irish former football player and manager, who played as a defender.

He played three times for the Republic of Ireland making his debut in a 6–0 defeat to Austria on 10 October 1971 in Linz.

He signed for Shamrock Rovers from Cork Hibernians in December 1972 and made his debut on the 17th of that month. While at Milltown he earned one cap away to France in 1973.

He also played for Galway United, going on to manage the Galway club twice (1979–1983, and 1988)
. He also managed Limerick.

His son Mark went to play for Cork City and Galway United in the 1990s.

Honours
Cork Hibernians
 League of Ireland: 1970–71
 FAI Cup: 1972
 League of Ireland Shield: 1972
 Blaxnit Cup: 1972
 Dublin City Cup: 1971

References 

1946 births
Living people
Republic of Ireland association footballers
Association football defenders
Republic of Ireland international footballers
Republic of Ireland under-23 international footballers
League of Ireland players
League of Ireland XI players
Cork Hibernians F.C. players
Shamrock Rovers F.C. players
Limerick F.C. players
Limerick F.C. managers
Drogheda United F.C. players
Galway United F.C. (1937–2011) players
League of Ireland managers
Galway United F.C. managers
Republic of Ireland football managers